EVI5L (Ecotropic Viral Integration Site 5-Like) is a protein that in humans is encoded by the EVI5L gene. EVI5L is a member of the Ras superfamily of monomeric guanine nucleotide-binding (G) proteins, and functions as a GTPase-activating protein (GAP) with a broad specificity. Measurement of in vitro Rab-GAP activity has shown that EVI5L has significant Rab2A- and Rab10-GAP activity.

Gene 

The EVI5L gene is 34,701 base pairs long and has an unprocessed mRNA that is 3,756 nucleotides in length. It consists of 19 exons that encode for an 805 amino acid protein.

Locus 

EVI5L is located on the short arm (p) of chromosome 19 in region 1, band 3, and sub-band 2 (19p13.2) starting at 7,830,275 base pairs and ending at 7,864,976 base pairs. It is encoded for on the plus strand. It is located near the CLEC4M (C-type lectin domain family 4, member M) gene, which is involved in peptide antigen transport.

Homology and Evolution

Homologous domains 

EVI5L contains a RAB-GAP TBC domain, which is involved with regulating membrane trafficking by cycling between inactive (GDP-bound) and active (GTP-bound) conformations. It also has the apolipophorin-III and tetratricopeptide repeat (TPR) domains. Apolipophorin-III play vital roles in the transport of lipids and lipoprotein metabolism, while TPR mediates protein-protein interactions and the assembly of multi protein complexes. These three domains are highly conserved in EVI5L orthologs.

Paralogs 

There are 7 moderately related proteins in humans that are paralogous to the RAB-GAP TBC domain of EVI5L. All of these proteins are in the guanosine nucleotide-binding protein family

Orthologs 

There are 63 orthologs of EVI5L that have been identified including mammals, birds, reptiles, and fish.  EVI5L is highly conserved among its orthologs but is not present in insects, plants, bacteria, archea or protists.

Homologs 

The following table lists the homologs of EVI5L:

Protein 

The protein of EVI5L consists of 805 amino acid residues. The molecular weight of the mature protein is 92.5 kdal with an isoelectric point of 5.05. EVI5L has an unusually large amount of glutamic acid residues, compared to similar proteins. Most of the protein is neutral, with no positive charge, negative charge, or mixed charge clusters. It has a very small negative hydrophobicity (-0.597019). EVI5L is a soluble protein that localizes in the nucleus. It contains no signal peptide, no mitochondrial targeting motifs and no peroxisomal targeting signal in the C-terminus. There is no transmembrane domain in EVI5L.

Isoforms 

EVI5L has two isoforms produced by alternative splicing. Isoform 2 is missing in-frame exon 11, making it shorter (794 amino acids).

Post-Translational Modifications 

Post translational modifications of EVI5L that are evolutionarily conserved in majority of the orthologs include glycosylation (C-mannosylation), glycation, phosphorylation (non-kinase and kinase specific), and sumoylation. There is also one leucine-rich nuclear export signal.

Secondary Structure 

The entire secondary structure of EVI5L is made up of alpha helices, with no beta sheets present. This is also true for EVI5Ls closest structural paralog, RABGAP1L.

Expression

Promoter 

The predicted promoter for the EVI5L gene spans 664 base pairs from 7,910,867 to 7,911,530 with a predicted transcriptional start site that is 114 base pairs and spans from 7,911,346 to 7,911,460.  The promoter region and beginning of the EVI5L gene (7,910,997 to 7,911,843) is not conserved past primates.  This region was used to determine transcription factor interactions.

Some of the main transcription factors predicted to bind to the promoter includes: activator-, mediator- and TBP-dependent core promoter element for RNA polymerase II transcription from TATA-less promoters, p53 tumor suppressor, brachyury gene, mesoderm developmental factor, EGR/nerve growth factor induced protein C & related factors, and GLI zinc finger family.

Expression 

Expression data from expressed sequence tag mapping, microarray and in situ hybridization shows EVI5L has ubiquitously low expression. However, it has slightly higher expression in the testis and fetal brain.

Function and Biochemistry 

The exact function of EVI5L is unknown. Given this, the paralogs of the gene are associated with starvation-induced autophagosome formation and trafficking and translocation of GLUT4-containing vesicles. Therefore, EVI5L is predicted to target endocytic vesicles.

Interacting Proteins

EVI5L has been shown to interact with NUDT18 (nucleoside diphosphate linked moiety X)-type motif 18 and SRPK2 (serine/threonine-protein kinase 2). NUDT18 is a member of the Nudix hydrolase family. Nudix hydrolases eliminate potentially toxic nucleotide metabolites from the cell and regulate the concentrations and availability of many different nucleotide substrates, cofactors, and signaling molecules. SRPK2 is a Serine/arginine rich protein-specific kinase which specifically phosphorylates its substrates at serine residues located in regions rich in arginine/serine dipeptides, known as RS domains and is involved in the phosphorylation of SR splicing factors and the regulation of splicing.

Clinical significance
Zebrafish deficient for Rab23 or its GTPase-activating protein, EVI5L, exhibit abnormal heart formation. This is attributed to the requirement of RAB23 in the differentiation of cardiac progenitor cells. RAB23 is required for normal development of the brain, spinal cord and heart, and without EVI5L to activate RAB23, abnormal formation of these organs ensues.

References

Further reading